The Hard Case is a 1995 British short film directed and written by Guy Ritchie and featured Darren Spencer as The player and Benedick Bates as a player and Wale Ojo as the gambler.  A twenty-minute film, it precedes Ritchie's better known Lock, Stock and Two Smoking Barrels.

Trudie Styler saw The Hard Case and invested money into Lock, Stock and Two Smoking Barrels (her husband Sting would play a role in this feature film).

Cast
 Darren Spencer as The player
 Benedick Bates as a Player
 Wale Ojo as The Gambler

References

External links

1990s crime films
1995 films
1995 short films
British short films
Films directed by Guy Ritchie
1990s English-language films